Bob Gluyas (born 2 February 1937) is a former Australian rules footballer who played with Essendon in the Victorian Football League (VFL). Gluyas returned to his old team, North Essendon Methodists, in 1960 after seriously injuring his ankle in 1958.

Notes

External links 
		

Essendon Football Club past player profile

1937 births
Living people
Australian rules footballers from Victoria (Australia)
Essendon Football Club players